Saúl Román Martínez Castañeda (born 3 July 1980) is a Mexican professional boxer and the former Mexican National Light Middleweight Champion.

Pro career 
Román defeated Michael Medina in Mexico.
On 27 April 2007, he lost by knockout to Argentine future world champion Sergio Martínez in a WBC Light Middleweight title eliminator bout. He also fought Yuri Foreman and lost by unanimous decision in 2008.

WBC Silver Championship 
On 4 June 2011 Saúl lost to undefeated Vanes Martirosyan for the WBC Silver Light Middleweight title. This bout was on HBO's televised portion of the Julio César Chávez, Jr. vs. Sebastian Zbik undercard.

Professional record 

|- style="margin:0.5em auto; font-size:95%;"
|align="center" colspan=8|37 Wins (31 knockouts), 11 Losses
|- style="margin:0.5em auto; font-size:95%;"
|align=center style="border-style: none none solid solid; background: #e3e3e3"|Res.
|align=center style="border-style: none none solid solid; background: #e3e3e3"|Record
|align=center style="border-style: none none solid solid; background: #e3e3e3"|Opponent
|align=center style="border-style: none none solid solid; background: #e3e3e3"|Type
|align=center style="border-style: none none solid solid; background: #e3e3e3"|Rd., Time
|align=center style="border-style: none none solid solid; background: #e3e3e3"|Date
|align=center style="border-style: none none solid solid; background: #e3e3e3"|Location
|align=center style="border-style: none none solid solid; background: #e3e3e3"|Notes
|-align=center
|Loss || 37-11 ||align=left| Charles Hatley
| || 2 (10)
| || align=left|
|align=left|
|-align=center
|Loss || 37-10 ||align=left| Curtis Stevens
| || 1 (10)
| || align=left|
|align=left|
|-align=center
|Win || 37-9 ||align=left| Jose Pinzon
| || 9 (10)
| || align=left|
|align=left|
|-align=center
|Loss || 36-9 ||align=left| Martin Avila
| || 2 (10)
| || align=left|
|align=left|
|-align=center
|Win || 35-9 ||align=left| Richard Gutierrez
| || 10
| || align=left|
|align=left|
|-align=center
|Loss || 34-9 ||align=left| Vanes Martirosyan
| || 7 (12) ||  || align=left|
|align=left|
|-align=center
|Win || 34-8 ||align=left| Michael Medina
| || 2 (10)
| || align=left|
|align=left|
|-align=center
|Win || 33-8 ||align=left| Joel Juarez
| || 3 (10)
| || align=left|
|align=left|
|-align=center
|Loss || 32-8 ||align=left| David Alonso Lopez
| || 12 (12)
| || align=left|
|align=left|
|-align=center
|Loss || 32-7 ||align=left| Thomas Oosthuizen
| || 8 (10)
| || align=left|
|align=left|
|-align=center
|Loss || 32-6 ||align=left| Gabriel Rosado
| || 10 (10)
| || align=left|
|align=left|
|-align=center

References

External links 

Boxers from Sinaloa
Sportspeople from Culiacán
Light-middleweight boxers
1980 births
Living people
Mexican male boxers